Todea tidwellii is an extinct species of fern in the genus Todea.  Fossils have been recovered from the Late Cretaceous of British Columbia.

References

mendeley.com

Osmundales
Ferns of the Americas